The Passion of Inge Krafft is a 1921 German silent drama film directed by Robert Dinesen and starring Mia May, Albert Steinrück and Conrad Veidt.

The film's sets were designed by the art director Otto Hunte.

Cast
 Mia May as Ingeborg Krafft
 Albert Steinrück as Fürst Wladimir Gagarine
 Conrad Veidt as Hendryck Overland
 Margarete Schön as Dagmar, Harry Radens Frau
 Heinz Stieda as Harry Raden
 Harry Hardt as Iwan, der Hirte
 Lia Eibenschütz
 Harry Frank
 Adolf Klein
 Paul Passarge
 Waldemar Potier
 Sylvia Torf

References

Bibliography
 Jennifer M. Kapczynski & Michael D. Richardson. A New History of German Cinema. Boydell & Brewer, 2014.
 John T. Soister. Conrad Veidt on Screen: A Comprehensive Illustrated Filmography. McFarland, 2002.

External links

1921 films
Films of the Weimar Republic
German silent feature films
Films directed by Robert Dinesen
German black-and-white films
1921 drama films
German drama films
UFA GmbH films
Silent drama films
1920s German films